Mountain Home, also known as Locust Hill and Robert Dickson House, is a historic home located near White Sulphur Springs, Greenbrier County, West Virginia. It was built about 1833, and is a large, two-story brick dwelling with a kitchen ell.  It features a two-story, one-bay lunette-adorned pediment with plastered brick Doric order paired columns. It has Late Federal and Roman Revival elements on both the exterior and interior.

It was built by "Greenbrier Valley master builder" John W. Dunn and includes mantels and other woodwork done by master wood-carver Conrad Burgess. Morlunda (Greenbrier County, West Virginia) is another of their joint works.

The house was listed on the National Register of Historic Places in 1980, with a boundary increase in 2020.

References

Neoclassical architecture in West Virginia
Federal architecture in West Virginia
Houses completed in 1833
Houses in Greenbrier County, West Virginia
Houses on the National Register of Historic Places in West Virginia
National Register of Historic Places in Greenbrier County, West Virginia
White Sulphur Springs, West Virginia
John W. Dunn buildings